Amir Hoghoughi (born 17 February 1994) is an Iranian weightlifter. He won the bronze medal in the men's 102 kg event at the 2021 World Weightlifting Championships held in Tashkent, Uzbekistan. He also won a silver medal at the 2019 Asian Weightlifting Championships in Ningbo.

Major results

References

External links
 
 Amir Hoghoughiosgouei - 2021 World Weightlifting Championships at Getty Images

1994 births
Living people
Iranian male weightlifters
World Weightlifting Championships medalists
21st-century Iranian people
Islamic Solidarity Games competitors for Iran